Andilly is a commune in the Charente-Maritime department in the Nouvelle-Aquitaine region of southwestern France.

The inhabitants of the commune are known as Andillais or Andillaises

Geography

Location
Andilly is a marshy commune in the western part of the Poitevin Marsh located in the northwest of the Charente-Maritime 6.5 km south of Marans, the chief town of the canton, and 17 km north-east of La Rochelle, the prefecture of the department.

Setting
The commune includes the town of Andilly, the village of "Sérigny", and a place called "Bel-Air".

Andilly belongs to the western or dried-up part of the Poitevin Marsh and is a large grain-producing area. The commune is polbut fgticularly well served by diversion canals, for draining and irrigation. Among these, two major canals cross the commune: the Canal du Curé crosses from east to west and the Canal from Marans to La Rochelle from north to south.

Andilly is watered in all the central parts and in the west by the Canal du Curé, which is formed from the lower reaches of the river Cure that is canalised from the commune of Anais. In Andilly, the Canal du Curé has long been called the Grand Canal of Andilly since its construction in 1771.

From north to south, the commune is traversed by the Canal from Marans to La Rochelle, which crosses the Canal du Curé northwest of Andilly town where significant crossing locks were built at a place called the Locks of Andilly.

History
During the Wars of Religion Andilly was an advanced military post.
There are remains of the castle
There are ruins of a priory and a castle with underground passages
There are also prehistoric underground refuges and relics

Administration

List of Successive Mayors

Population

Distribution of Age Groups

The population of the commune is younger than the departmental average.

Percentage Distribution of Age Groups in Andilly and Charente-Maritime Department in 2017

Source: INSEE

Sites and monuments
The Dairy and Casein Factory (19th century) is registered as an historical monument.
The Church of Saint Nazaire

Remains of a medieval castle and a priory.

Transport

Railway Stations and Halts
La Rochelle (TGV) 14.7 km
Aytré (Halt) 16.2 km
Angoulins (Halt) 17.6 km
Châtelaillon 20.2 km
Surgères (TGV) 25.4 km

Airports and Aerodromes
La Rochelle 15.6 km
Rochefort-Saint-Agnant 40.8 km
Niort 48.2 km

Roads
The D137 crosses the commune from Marans in the north passing between Andilly town and Serigny and continuing south to Usseau
The D20 connects the D137 to Andilly town and continues south-west to Villedoux
The D202 goes south from the town to Saint-Ouen-d'Aunis
The D112 goes south-east from the town to Longèves

Sports
Andilly was the arrival point of the 1st stage and departure point of the 2nd stage of the Tour du Poitou-Charentes in 2004.

See also
Communes of the Charente-Maritime department

References

External links

Andilly on the National Geographic Institute website 
Andilly on Géoportail, National Geographic Institute (IGN) website 
Andilly on the 1750 Cassini Map

Communes of Charente-Maritime
Arrondissement of La Rochelle
Canton of Marans